The 2026 Mediterranean Games, officially known as the XX Mediterranean Games and commonly known as Taranto 2026, is a forthcoming international multi-sport event that is scheduled to be held from 13 to 22 June 2026 in Taranto, Italy. Taranto was announced as the host city at the ICMG General Assembly in Patras, Greece, on 24 August 2019.

Bidding process 
In July 2019, the International Committee of Mediterranean Games (CIJM) announced the end of the candidature process and the sole candidate city, Taranto, for the 2026 Games, but on 24 August, Taranto was awarded the 2026 Games following a unanimous vote by the CIJM.

Development and preparation

Venues 
23 olympic sports will be disputed and also 2 non-olympic ones, with 7 team sports. The following sites and venues will be concerned: Taranto, Torricella, Sava, San Giorgio Jonico, Massafra, Martina Franca, Grottaglie, Ginosa, Crispiano, Castellaneta, Lecce, Brindisi, Francavilla Fontana, Fasano, Monopoli and the Valle d’Itria for cycling. The venues that will be rebuilt or improved are: «il campo scuola al quartiere Salinella, the stadio Iacovone, the Stadio Via del Mare, the Palamazzola, the Palafiom, the pattinodromo della Salinella and the circolo Tennis.

Emblem 
The emblem for the 2026 Mediterranean Games was unveiled on 14 December 2019 at the Palace of Taranto. It was designed by the Istituto Comprensivo Gaetano Salvemini as part of a contest announced in May by the Municipality of Taranto. Resembling the Sailor Monument in the city, the emblem is formed up of two anthropomorphized x's that compose the number 20 written in Roman numerals.

References 

Mediterranean Games
Mediterranean Games
International sports competitions hosted by Italy
June 2026 sports events
2026
Mediterranean Games 2026